Clwyd South West was a county constituency in Clwyd, North Wales.  It returned one Member of Parliament (MP)  to the House of Commons of the Parliament of the United Kingdom by the first past the post system of election.

The constituency was created for the 1983 general election, and abolished for the 1997 general election. It was a marginal seat throughout its lifetime.

Boundaries 
This was a constituency of a varied nature, being made up of former mining villages close to Wrexham (such as Rhosllannerchrugog), the towns of Denbigh, Llangollen, and Ruthin, and a large area of sparsely populated countryside. The seat was abolished and split into three new constituencies on the recommendation of the Boundary Commission for Wales to create an extra seat in Clwyd for the 1997 general election.

Members of Parliament

Elections

Elections in the 1980s

Elections in the 1990s

See also 
List of parliamentary constituencies in Clwyd

Notes and references 

Clwyd
Historic parliamentary constituencies in North Wales
Constituencies of the Parliament of the United Kingdom established in 1983
Constituencies of the Parliament of the United Kingdom disestablished in 1997